Pavel Horák (born 28 November 1982) is a Czech handballer for HK Lovosice and the Czech national team.

References

External links

1982 births
Living people
Sportspeople from Přerov
Czech male handball players
Frisch Auf Göppingen players
Füchse Berlin Reinickendorf HBC players
THW Kiel players
Expatriate handball players
Czech expatriate sportspeople in Belarus
Czech expatriate sportspeople in Germany
Handball-Bundesliga players